This is a list of songs that topped the Belgian Walloon (francophone) Ultratop 40 in 2009.

See also
List of Ultratop 50 number-one hits of 2009

References

External links
 Ultratop 40

Ultratop 40
Belgium Ultratop 40
2009